Guy Dufaux (born July 18, 1943, in Lille, France) is a French-born Canadian cinematographer. The majority of his works have been in Canadian cinema; he immigrated to Canada in 1965 and became a Canadian citizen in 1971. He is also the father of Montréal-based sculptor Pascal Dufaux and the brother of the late Canadian documentary filmmaker, Georges Dufaux.

Recognition 
 2006 Montreal World Film Festival Best Artistic Contribution - The Chinese Botanist's Daughters - Won
 2002 Jutra Award for Best Cinematography (Meilleure Direction de la Photographie) - Tar Angel - Nominated
 2002 Canadian Society of Cinematographers Awards Kodak New Century Award
 2001 Genie Award for Best Achievement in Cinematography - Stardom - Nominated
 2001 Gemini Award for Best Photography in a Dramatic Program or Series - Haven - Won
 2000 Jutra Award for Best Cinematography (Meilleure Photographie) - The Eleventh Child - Nominated 
 1996 Genie Award for Best Achievement in Cinematography - Polygraph (Le Polygraphe) - Nominated
 1992 Genie Award for Best Achievement in Cinematography - Léolo - Nominated
 1991 Genie Award for  Best Achievement in Cinematography - Moody Beach - Nominated
 1991 Genie Award for Best Achievement in Cinematography - Nelligan - Nominated
 1990 Genie Award for Best Achievement in Cinematography - Jesus of Montreal - Won
 1988 Genie Award for Best Achievement in Cinematography - Night Zoo - Won
 1987 Genie Award for Best Achievement in Cinematography - Equinox (Équinoxe) - Nominated

External links 
 
 The Film Reference Library

1943 births
Living people
Best Cinematography Genie and Canadian Screen Award winners
Canadian cinematographers
French emigrants to Canada
People from Lille